Elections to Liverpool Town Council were held on Wednesday 1 November 1843. One third of the council seats were up for election, the term of office of each councillor being three years.

Two of the sixteen wards were uncontested.

After the election, the composition of the council was:

Election result

Ward results

* - Retiring Councillor seeking re-election

Abercromby

Although both candidates were Conservative, Charles Boutflower "promised to support the exclusive system at the Corporation Schools", whilst Daniel Neilson stood in opposition to this stance.

Polling Place : A Booth in the Joiner's Yard of Thomas Bag?, on the east side of Mount-pleasant, nearly opposite the fever ward.

Castle Street

Polling Place : The House, formerly the Queen's Arms Hotel, Castle-street.

Everton

Polling Place : Halliday's Everton Coffee House, Everton.

Exchange

Polling Place : The north end of the Sessions'-house, in Chapel-street.

Great George

Polling Place : The Shop, No. 64, on the north side of Nelson-street, occupied by Mr. Richard Hesketh.

Lime Street

Polling Place : The Public-house of William Precott, at the corner of St. Vincent-street, London Road.

North Toxteth

Polling Place : A Booth, on the Land situated on the east side of Park-road, and south side of St. Patrick's Chapel.

Pitt Street

Polling Place : The Committee-room of the South Corporation School, in Park-lane.

Rodney Street

Polling Place : The Shop near the entrance of the New Arcade, on the west side of Renshaw-street, occupied by Mr. Bryson.

St. Anne Street

Polling Place : The House of William Dyer, No. 52, on the south side of Christian-street

St. Paul's

Polling Place : Mr. Mather's Baths, at the north west corner of St. Paul's-square.

St. Peter's

Polling Place : The Horse and Jockey, in Seel-street.

Scotland

Polling Place : The House, No. 61, on the south side of Burlington Street, near Limekiln-lane occupied by Mrs. Bell.

South Toxteth

Polling Place : The Shop on the west side of Park-road, occupied by William McCartney, near the Church of John the Baptist.

Vauxhall

Polling Place : The House occupied by Edward Ashort, nearly opposite the end of Naylor-street, being on the west side of Vauxhall-road.

West Derby

Polling Place : The House on the south side of Edge-hill, opposite the Church in the occupation of Mr. Thomas Proctor.

See also
Liverpool Town Council elections 1835 - 1879
Liverpool City Council elections 1880–present
Mayors and Lord Mayors
of Liverpool 1207 to present
History of local government in England

References

1843
1843 English local elections
November 1843 events
1840s in Liverpool